The 2015 Avon Tyres British GT season was the 23rd season of the British GT Championship. The season began on 6 April at Oulton Park and finished on 13 September at Donington Park, after nine rounds held over seven meetings. Beechdean Motorsport won both the GT3 and GT4 drivers championships. Team owner Andrew Howard won his second title with Jonathan Adam in GT3 while Jamie Chadwick and Ross Gunn claimed honours in GT4.

Entry list

Race calendar
The provisional 2015 calendar was announced on 5 November 2014. Spa-Francorchamps will host a two-hour endurance race as opposed to two hour-long races in 2014. All races except Belgian round at Spa, were held in the United Kingdom.

Championship standings
Points system
Points are awarded as follows:

Drivers' championships

GT3

References

External links
 

	

British GT Championship seasons
GT Championship